John Darling is an American comic strip, created by Tom Batiuk, a spin-off of his earlier comic strip Funky Winkerbean. John Darling appeared from March 25, 1979, to August 4, 1990.

History
John Darling, a talk-show host, was originally a supporting character in Batiuk's strip Funky Winkerbean before being spun off into his own strip. The original artist was Tom Armstrong, who left the strip in 1985 for his own creation, Marvin, though he did return to draw the final three weeks of the strip. His replacement was Gerry Shamray, whose first strip was dated March 3, 1985.

Much of the strip's humor came from Darling's outsized ego, quirks and frequent displays of ignorance; in one strip, he interviews musician Prince, asking him "Exactly which country are you a prince of?" Other featured characters were Darling's co-workers at "Channel One", the TV station where he worked, including ratings-obsessed producer Reed Roberts; clueless old-school anchor Charlie Lord; shrewish reporter Brenda Harpy; and insecure weatherman Phil. However, the strip also featured a large number of parodic appearances by celebrities (often being interviewed by Darling); this was such a feature of the strip that numerous newspapers carried John Darling on their TV page, rather than the comics page. Sunday strips generally included two panels of "TV Trivia" content otherwise unrelated to the strip as a whole.

John Darling wound down in 1990, as Batiuk by his own account was growing tired of the work it involved. The strip was no longer financially remunerative, as it had been dropped by numerous newspapers. Batiuk also had a contractual conflict with his syndicate over ownership of the character, so he stunned the strip's remaining readers by killing off Darling in the next-to-last strip. (The final strip featured other characters gathered around Darling's gravesite.) With John Darling having been dropped by a number of newspapers over the years, the syndicate decided the strip was simply no longer profitable, and allowed it to die.

John Darling's murder (which had been depicted as being by an unknown assailant) stayed unsolved until a 1997 Funky Winkerbean storyline celebrating that strip's 25th anniversary. Over the course of the storyline, Winkerbean character Les Moore wrote a book on Darling's murder ("Fallen Star") and solved the case. The murderer was revealed to be Peter Mossman, alias Plantman, an occasional character in the strip who reported on gardening and environmental issues.

While Darling himself was rarely mentioned in Funky Winkerbean in the years immediately following his 1990 demise, Darling's daughter Jessica appeared as a regular in the Funky Winkerbean strip until 2007, when the feature was reformatted by moving the continuing story up several years. The book about Darling's murder was referenced again during a 2010 strip, and Jessica reappeared in 2011. By 2013, John was mentioned quite often, as a continuing Funky Winkerbean plotline had Jessica actively searching for information about the father she lost at a very young age. Phil the Forecaster also made very, very occasional appearances in Funky Winkerbean, reappearing most recently in 2021 as he retired from his weather forecasting job at Channel One after over 40 years. Several minor characters in Funky Winkerbean'''s other spin-off strip Crankshaft have also worked at Channel One.

References

External links
John Darling at Don Markstein's Toonopedia. Archived from the original on October 8, 2016.

Further reading
 Strickler, Dave. Syndicated Comic Strips and Artists, 1924-1995: The Complete Index.'' Cambria, CA: Comics Access, 1995. .

1979 comics debuts
1990 comics endings
Darling, John
American comic strips
Comics characters introduced in 1979
Comics spin-offs
Fictional television personalities
Gag-a-day comics
Darling, John